The Thomas M. Babington House was built in about 1900.  It is a one-story vernacular Colonial Revival building which has some Queen Anne details.  Colonial Revival details include its Tuscan gallery columns.  It was used for a number of years as a hospital and then as a medical clinic.

The house was home of Thomas Babington, one of four Babington brothers important in Franklinton history for their efforts, eventually successful, to secure a railway to be built into the town.

See also
Robert H. Babington House, also NRHP-listed in Franklinton

References

Houses on the National Register of Historic Places in Louisiana
Colonial Revival architecture in Louisiana
Washington Parish, Louisiana